Poa, Boulkiemdé is a town in the Poa Department of Boulkiemdé Province in central western Burkina Faso. It is the capital of the Poa Department and has a population of 7,037.

References

External links
Satellite map at Maplandia.com

Populated places in Boulkiemdé Province